Remi Chandran is an environmental policy researcher who developed the Wildlife Enforcement Monitoring System (WEMS) initiative while working with the United Nations University (UNU), Tokyo in 2005.  His idea of building a common information sharing framework (bridging policy makers, enforcement officials, researchers and civil society members) to monitor illegal wildlife crime questioned the current practice of enforcement information sharing which relied on  closed information where participation of scientific experts were discouraged. The first prototype of WEMS was developed in partnership with Asian Conservation Alliance, a network of grass root civil society members from 14 Asian Countries. In 2007, he moved to United Nations University – International Institute for Software Technology based in Macao as a Senior Researcher where he re-constituted the project to the needs of government agencies. The success of WEMS however had to wait until 2011 when Lusaka Agreement finally approved the implementation of Wildlife Enforcement Monitoring System in East Africa.

Chandran left UN in 2010  but leads the WEMS initiative and continues to serve in its management committee.

In a recent journal article, he explains the limitation of science and scientists in addressing the gaps in enforcement information sharing, where he outlines the role of policy beliefs as a key factor in the acceptance and rejection of a transboundary enforcement monitoring system.

Chandran is a recipient of the Irish government fellowship (1995) the Erasmus Mundus (2010) fellowship and the UNU-IAS PhD Fellowship (2012–2014)

References
 Chandran, Remi, Robert Hoppe, W.T. De Vries, & Yola Georgiadou (in press). Conflicting policy beliefs and informational complexities in designing a transboundary enforcement monitoring system.  Journal of Cleaner Production
 Chandran, R., Krishnan, P., & Nguyen, K. (2011). Wildlife Enforcement Monitoring System (WEMS): A solution to support compliance of Multilateral Environmental Agreements. Government Information Quarterly,Volume 28, Issue 2, April 2011, Pages 231–238. 
 African Wildlife Monitored and Protected
 Boosting CITES -Jacob Phelps, Edward L. Webb, David Bickford, Vincent Nijman and Navjot S. Sodhi (2010), Science Journal
 New UN database to help combat wildlife crime – 4 June 2007, Reuters.
 UN University launches system to combat illegal wildlife trade – 28 September 2006, Japan Times (Kyodo News)
 国際連合大学が野生動物の違法取引監視システムをESRI社のGISを用いて構築
 Will regional monitoring systems help in environmental governance?  A case study on the WEMS model for monitoring enforcement of CITES Convention.

Indian environmentalists
Living people
Year of birth missing (living people)